The 2020 Cavan Intermediate Football Championship was the 56th edition of Cavan GAA's premier Gaelic football tournament for intermediate graded clubs in County Cavan, Ireland. The tournament consists of 15 teams, the winner will not represent Cavan in the Ulster Intermediate Club Football Championship this year due to its cancellation.

The championship starts with a league stage and then progresses to a knock out stage. The COVID-19 pandemic brought forward the beginning and end dates for the championship but the format was not changed, although there was no relegation this year.

Ballinagh won the championship by defeating first-time finalists Butlersbridge in the decider.

Team Changes
The following teams have changed division since the 2018 championship season.

To Championship
Promoted from 2019 Cavan Junior Football Championship
  Killinkere  –  (Junior Champions)
Relegated from 2019 Cavan Senior Football Championship
  Cootehill

From Championship
Promoted to 2020 Cavan Senior Football Championship
  Laragh United  –  (Intermediate Champions)
Relegated to 2020 Cavan Junior Football Championship
  Swanlinbar

League Stage
All 15 teams enter the competition at this stage. A random draw determines which teams face each other in each of the four rounds. No team can meet each other twice in the group stage. The top 8 teams go into a seeded draw for the quarter-finals.

Round 1

Round 2

Round 3

Round 4

Round 5

Knock-Out Stage

Quarter-finals

Semi-finals

Final

References

External links
 Cavan at ClubGAA
 Official Cavan GAA Website

Cavan IFC
Cavan Intermediate
Cavan GAA Football championships